Pedro Alcalá Guirado (born 19 March 1989) is a Spanish professional footballer who plays for FC Cartagena as a central defender.

Club career
Born in Mazarrón, Region of Murcia, Alcalá was a product of Málaga CF's youth academy. He appeared once for the first team in the 2006–07 season, with the Andalusians in the Segunda División. Subsequently, he spent two years on loan in Segunda División B, with AD Alcorcón and UD Marbella.

In late August 2009, another season-long loan was arranged as Alcalá joined recently promoted club Real Unión. After being relegated from the second division and having played less than half of the league's matches, his contract with Málaga expired and was not renewed, so the player was released; soon afterwards, he joined Getafe CF's reserves in the third tier.

Alcalá signed with UD Almería's B team in the summer of 2011, again as a free agent. The following week, he was called to the main squad for preseason.

In July 2013, Alcalá moved to division two side Real Murcia. Exactly one year later, having featured sparingly in his only season, he joined UE Llagostera.

On 30 August 2015, Alcalá signed for fellow league team Girona FC after agreeing to a four-year deal. He was an undisputed starter the following campaigns, achieving promotion to La Liga in 2017.

Alcalá made his debut in the top flight on 19 August 2017, starting in a 2–2 home draw against Atlético Madrid. He scored his first goal in the competition seven days later, the game's only in a home victory over Málaga CF.

On 5 October 2020, Alcalá signed a two-year deal with top-tier Cádiz CF after terminating his contract with Girona. The following 13 August, he moved to second division side FC Cartagena on a contract of the same duration.

Career statistics

Club

Honours
Spain U20
Mediterranean Games: 2009

References

External links

1989 births
Living people
People from Mazarrón
Spanish footballers
Footballers from the Region of Murcia
Association football defenders
La Liga players
Segunda División players
Segunda División B players
Atlético Malagueño players
Málaga CF players
AD Alcorcón footballers
Marbella FC players
Real Unión footballers
Getafe CF B players
UD Almería B players
Real Murcia players
UE Costa Brava players
Girona FC players
Cádiz CF players
FC Cartagena footballers
Spain youth international footballers
Mediterranean Games medalists in football
Mediterranean Games gold medalists for Spain
Competitors at the 2009 Mediterranean Games